Rodino is a rural locality (a selo) and the administrative center of Rodinsky District of Altai Krai, Russia. Population:

Geography 
Rodino is located in the Kulunda Plain,  to the southeast of Lake Kuchuk.

References

Notes

Sources

Rural localities in Rodinsky District